Poynter is an English occupational surname for the maker of cord that fastened doublet with hose (clothing). The name derives from the Middle English "poynte" and originally from the Latin "puncta", meaning to pierce. Poynter may also be an Anglicised variant of the Huguenot name 'Pointier'.

Notable people
Andrew Poynter (born 1987), English-born Irish cricketer
Beulah Poynter (1883–1960), American actress and author
Dougie Poynter (born 1987), English musician
Edward Poynter (1836–1919), British painter
Jane Poynter, American author, businesswoman, and environmentalist
James I. Poynter (1916–1950), United States Medal of Honor recipient
Nelson Poynter (1903–1978), American publisher
Rikki Poynter (born 1991), deaf American YouTuber and activist
Robert Poynter (born 1937), American sprinter
Stuart Poynter (born 1990), English-born Irish cricketer
William Poynter (1762–1827, English Catholic bishop
William A. Poynter (1848–1909), the 14th Governor of Nebraska, 1899–1901

See also
 Poynter Institute, a non-profit journalism organization
Pointer (surname)
 Poynter Baronets

English-language surnames